Ognibene is a surname. Notable people with the surname include:

Carl Ognibene (born 1970), American wrestler, freestyle wrestler and mixed martial artist who is best known as Carl Malenko
Tom Ognibene (1943–2015), American attorney and politician